Bishop Justus Church of England School is a mixed secondary school and sixth form in the Bromley area of the London Borough of Bromley, England.

The school was first established in 2004, and is the only non-selective Church of England secondary school in Bromley under the direction of the Diocese of Rochester. The school also has a specialism in music.

Bishop Justus School was converted to academy status in February 2012, and was previously under the direct control of Bromley London Borough Council. The school continues to coordinate with Bromley London Borough Council for admissions.

References

External links
Bishop Justus CE School official website

Secondary schools in the London Borough of Bromley
Church of England secondary schools in the Diocese of Rochester
Academies in the London Borough of Bromley
Educational institutions established in 2004
2004 establishments in England
Specialist music colleges in England